Tracy Lee may refer to:
Tracey Lee (female impersonator) (1933–1990), Australian cabaret artiste and female impersonator
Tracy Lee (actress)  (born 1985), Malaysian Chinese actress and television host
Tracey Lee (born 1970), American rapper